Gallegos del Río is a municipality located in the province of Zamora, Castile and León, Spain. According to the 2009 census (INE), the municipality has a population of 663 inhabitants.

Town hall
Gallegos del Río is home to the town hall of 7 villages:
Domez (160 inhabitants, INE 2020).
Gallegos del Río (82 inhabitants, INE 2020).
Valer (78 inhabitants, INE 2020).
Puercas (56 inhabitants, INE 2020).
Flores (44 inhabitants, INE 2020).
Lober (34 inhabitants, INE 2020).
Tolilla (12 inhabitants, INE 2020).

References

Municipalities of the Province of Zamora